Parapoynx candida is a moth in the family Crambidae. It was described by Ping You and Hou-Hun Li in 2005. It is found in China.

References

Acentropinae
Moths described in 2005